Olyssa is a monotypic moth genus of the family Erebidae. Its only species, Olyssa calamitosa, is found in Australia in Western Australia and the Northern Territory. Both the genus and the species were first described by Francis Walker in 1858.

The wingspan is about 40 mm.

References

Calpinae
Monotypic moth genera